Quinta Vergara is a park located in Viña del Mar, Chile. The park features three major landmarks: the Palacio Vergara, the Quinta Vergara Amphitheater and a garden. Every year the park is home to the Viña del Mar International Song Festival.

Park landmarks

Palace Vergara

The Palacio Vergara is the former home of Jose Francisco Vergara, the founder of Viña del Mar. The home was built by the Vergara family in 1910 in a Venetian Gothic style. The home serves as a replacement to the family's former home, which was destroyed in the 1906 Valparaíso earthquake. In 1941 the city bought the building and it was converted into a museum of fine art, which features over 60 works of art. The park around the home features sculptures and statues, including a bust of writer Gabriela Mistral.

Quinta Vergara Amphitheater

The Quinta Vergara Amphitheater was built after the first Viña del Mar International Song Festival.

Artequin Museum of Viña del Mar
The Artequin Museum of Viña del Mar opened in 2008. It is an interactive based museum, which features a collection of photographic reproductions of major works from Western art history.

Gallery

External links
 Artequin Museum of Viña del Mar
 Vina del Mar: Museums 

Museums in Valparaíso Region
Geography of Valparaíso Region
Parks in Chile
Tourist attractions in Valparaíso Region
Vergara family